Mateusz Łuczak (born 13 March 1990) is a Polish footballer who plays as a forward for Weszło Warsaw.

Career 
In 2013, he announced his retirement from professional football, but later continued playing for amateur clubs. In 2021, he joined the regional league's expansion team Weszło Warsaw.

References

1990 births
Living people
Sportspeople from Gdańsk
Polish footballers
Association football midfielders
Ekstraklasa players
Lechia Gdańsk players
Bałtyk Gdynia players
Korona Kielce players
Gryf Wejherowo players
Gedania 1922 Gdańsk players
KTS Weszło Warsaw players